Gudos is a village in far northern Tajikistan. It is located in Asht District in Sughd Region.

References

Populated places in Sughd Region